Audlem railway station was a station on the former Great Western Railway between Market Drayton and Nantwich, opened in 1863.

It served the village of Audlem in Cheshire, England until closure in 1963. The station was immortalised in the song "Slow Train" by Flanders and Swann.

History 
The station was built by the Nantwich and Market Drayton Railway (N&MDR) and opened on 20 October 1863, although the line was operated by the Great Western Railway from its opening, and the N&MDR eventually amalgamated with the Great Western Railway in 1897. The line passed on to the Western Region of British Railways on nationalisation in 1948, and was then closed to passengers by the British Railways Board on 9 September 1963.

Stationmasters

James Ralphs
Samuel Lloyd ca. 1865 - 1867
Mr. Edwards from 1867
Thomas Neggington ca. 1869
Thomas Diggory ca. 1871
Thomas Peate ca. 1879 - 1893
John Evans ca. 1896
William Richards ca. 1898 - 1905 
J.R. Martin 1905 - 1909
Henry Rickard 1909 - 1918 (formerly station master at Adderley)
Archibald Stewart Rickard 1918 - 1931 (formerly station master at Peplow)
R. Hughes 1931 - 1936
William Griffin 1936  - 1940 (formerly station master at Berrington)
H.S. Stockton 1940 - 1942
W.N. Owen 1942 - 1949 (formerly station master at Peplow, afterwards station master at Church Stretton)
C. Corley ca. 1949

Routes

References

 
 
 
 By Great Western to Crewe, by Bob Yate, published by The Oakwood Press

Further reading

External links

 Disused stations
 Station on navigable O.S. map

Former Great Western Railway stations
Railway stations in Great Britain opened in 1863
Railway stations in Great Britain closed in 1963
Disused railway stations in Cheshire